Adolf Lesser (22 May 1851 – 1926) was a German physician who specialized in forensic medicine. He was born in the city of Stargard, West Prussia.

Lesser studied medicine at the University of Berlin, and from 1877 to 1884 was an assistant at the institute of pharmacology in Berlin. In 1886, he was appointed city physician in Breslau, and during the following year became an associate professor at the University of Breslau. He remained at Breslau until his retirement in 1921.

He was the author of numerous articles in medical journals, his best known written work being the 1892  (Atlas of Forensic Medicine).

References 
 Jewish Encyclopedia, Biography

German pathologists
Forensic pathologists
Academic staff of the University of Breslau
1851 births
1926 deaths
People from Starogard Gdański
People from the Province of Prussia